Chow Park Wing (born c. 1924) was a Burmese sailor. He competed at the 1956 Summer Olympics and the 1960 Summer Olympics.

References

External links
 

1920s births
Possibly living people
Burmese male sailors (sport)
Olympic sailors of Myanmar
Sailors at the 1956 Summer Olympics – 12 m2 Sharpie
Sailors at the 1960 Summer Olympics – Flying Dutchman
Place of birth missing (living people)